Sandi Čolnik, born in 1937 as Alexander Ludovik Čolnik, was a Slovene journalist, TV presenter, writer and newspaper editor. He was born in Maribor in 1938 and died in Ljubljana in 2017.

Čolnik started his career as a radio host on Radio Maribor. He decided to go Ljubljana to study the law, but finally change his mind and goes for journalism after working as a remplacent on RTV Slovenia.

He devoted a lot of his career to cultural journalism and was appreciated for his interviews. He was already known in the sixties for the emission TV pošta, and in the seventies for his work on Monitor, a program that aired in the entirety of Yugoslavia. He also worked as a host for music festivals and gala nights. He decided to retire in 2000.

He received the Jurčič prize in 1997. The prize awards excellence in journalism and the liberty of journalism and redaction in Slovenia.

He was married with  Dr. Monika Brumen and they had two daughters.

Čolnik died in 2017, at the age 80. The Slovenian public remembers him for his velvet voice and his gift for journalism.

References 

1937 births
2017 deaths
Slovenian journalists
Slovenian radio personalities
Slovenian television personalities
Writers from Maribor